Mamady "Wadaba" Kourouma (born 1963) is a master drummer from Guinea.

Early life

He was born into a blacksmith family of traditional Malinke drummers, and raised in the village of Oroko near Kouroussa, Guinea, West Africa.  He learned from the age of eight all of his people's traditional drum music and dances as passed down from his ancestors. He was nicknamed "The Great Panther" because of his powerful sound on the djembe drum.

Career

In 1993 he became the primary apprentice of the legendary djembe master Famoudou Konaté. Since then he has toured in Germany, Japan, and the United States, teaching and performing with Konaté and Mamady Keïta, and with his own group, Annye Ben. Kourouma has appeared on four CDs, plus his own CD, Oroko Kan. In 2003, Famoudou Konaté released him from his apprenticeship, and proclaimed him a master drummer and drum builder in his own right. He is a director for the charity organization, the Oroko Fund, and featured instructor for the African Village Drum Adventure in Guinea.

Mamady Kourouma's nickname, “Wadaba”, means Great Panther, and comes from the people of his motherland, who say his sound on the djembe drum has the power of a wild cat's scream.

Born in the Malinke blacksmith/drummer family lineage, in the Sankaran region of northern Guinea, West Africa, Kourouma was given a tiny djembe when he was eight years old. With his father, uncles, and brothers, he began to play alongside them at village festivals and celebrations. By age ten, he was taking turns as a soloist, and by his teen years he had learned all of their traditional rhythms, and had achieved the status as one of the lead soloists of his village.

Kourouma moved to the capital city of Conakry to work, and a year later was accepted as apprentice by the well-known drummer, Famoudou Konate. Konate is 26-year veteran of Les Ballets Africains de Guinee, the original national performing group of Guinea that toured the world as musical “ambassadors”, representing the many cultures of Guinea, after its independence from France in 1958. Although Kourouma was already an accomplished drummer, living and performing with Konate improved his skills. As apprentice for Konate, Kourouma gained experience teaching drumming to the European guests that would visit Konate's compound each year, and also helped Kourouma learn Konate's techniques for drum building.

Mamady Keita, 22-year lead drummer for Ballet Joliba, also of Guinea, took notice of Kourouma's playing skills as well. In January 1995, Kourouma appeared on Mamady Keita's Mogobalu CD, and again recorded with him in February 1996 on Keita's Hamana CD. Kourouma toured with Keita, Konate, and the rest of Mogobalu (“the Masters”) to Japan in August of that year, where he was featured as a lead drummer.

Kourouma also appeared on two of Famoudou Konate's CDs: Rhythmen und Lieder aus Guinea, recorded in Conakry in December 1995 and produced in Germany, where Wadaba is pictured on the cover in full traditional drumming regalia, and also on the French CD, Guinee: Percussions et Chants Malinke with Famoudou Konate maitre-djembe & l’Ensemble Hamana Dan Ba, recorded in February 1998.

In addition to Guinea, Kourouma has also toured Germany and the US teaching and performing. He knows that as villagers embrace modern life, their traditional rituals and the drum rhythms that accompany them will disappear, and that teaching those rhythms will help them live on. His elders, Konate and Keita, have for many years worked to preserve Malinke musical traditions.

In 2001, Kourouma planned to record his first CD in his home village, Oroko, to do his part in traditional music preservation. But in January of that year, the village burned to the ground. Recording efforts turned into aid efforts. All the drums had burned. The Oroko Fund was created and in February 2002, after a year of fundraising, Kourouma, and American percussionist, Keio Ogawa, presented the people of Oroko with over 500 pounds of clothes and a full set of drums. Since then, money raised by the Oroko Fund has, each year, aided projects for the poor in Oroko, including food, clothing, medical and school supplies, and, most recently, a second clean well for the village.

In September 2002 Kourouma released his own solo CD, The Great Panther of Guinea, Mamady “WADABA” Kourouma – Oroko Kan! which received rave reviews.

In 2003, Kourouma and Ogawa were married. That same year, his master, Famoudou Konate, released Kourouma from his apprenticeship and proclaimed Kourouma a master drummer and drum builder in his own right.

With his wife and family, Kourouma has built a travel adventure destination in Oroko: the African Village Drum Adventure. Participants are guided through Guinea to the heart of Malinke drumming. There they experience African village life, drum and dance classes, traditional rituals and festivals, and then return home with an expanded world view and memories they will treasure forever.

Spending part of his time in Guinea, and part at his home in Three Rivers, Central California, Kourouma continues to work with Konate and Keita, teach classes and clinics, build drums, and perform with his ensemble Annye Ben, locally and throughout the world.  Wadaba is on faculty  at The DrumConnection, Boston, Massachusetts.

Mamady "Wadaba" Kourouma's "Sabari" was nominated for the 8th Annual Independent Music Awards for World Traditional Album of the year.

References

External links
Official site

Discography
2002 - Oroko Kan - 2002, ELSP

See also
Djembe

Kourouma, Mamady "WADABA"
Kourouma, Mamady "WADABA"
1963 births
Living people
Guinean musicians